Dapa, officially the Municipality of Dapa (Surigaonon: Lungsod nan Dapa), is a 4th class municipality in the province of Surigao del Norte, Philippines. According to the 2020 census, it has a population of 29,006 people.

Geography
Most of the municipality is situated on Siargao Island, but Middle Bucas Grande and East Bucas Grande Islands are also within its jurisdiction. It is known as the "Growth Center of the beautiful islands of Siargao".

Barangays
Dapa is politically subdivided into 29 barangays.

Barangays 1 through 13 constitute Dapa's poblacion.
Barangay Don Paulino is synonymous with the village of Giwan.  Barangay Union is synonymous with the village of Union.

Climate

Demographics

Surigaonon is the common local language, while Cebuano, Filipino, and English are also spoken.

Sports

The Siargao Sports Complex is a sports complex with a cost of PP300 million, it can accommodate 5,000 persons, expected to be finished by 2017 or early 2018, but opened and inaugurated in January 2020. Once completed, Siargao Sports Complex will host the regional games, which will mark its first hosting rights in the history of Caraga Region.

Infrastructure

Telecommunication
The Philippine Long Distance Telephone Company provides fixed line services. Wireless mobile communications services are provided by Smart Communications and Globe Telecommunications.

Education
Dapa is considered as the center of education in the island. The newly established Siargao National Science High School is the home of scholar students who are gifted in the field of science and mathematics. It may as well develop a strong science culture among high schools in the island.

Colleges:
Siargao Island Institute of Technology
Siargao National College of Science and Technology

High schools:
Dapa National High School
Consolacion National High School
Union National High School
Dagohoy National High School 
Siargao National Science High School
San Nicolas School

Media
 DXSS, Radyo Kidlat.

References

External links

 Dapa Profile at PhilAtlas.com
 Dapa Profile at the DTI Cities and Municipalities Competitive Index
 [ Philippine Standard Geographic Code]
 Philippine Census Information
 Local Governance Performance Management System 

Municipalities of Surigao del Norte